This article traces the history of Dallas, Texas, (United States).

Territorial period (1500s–1838) 

The Caddo inhabited the Dallas area before it was settled by Europeans, along with the rest of Texas, as a part of the Spanish Viceroyalty of New Spain in the 16th century. The area was also claimed by the French, but in 1819 the Adams-Onís Treaty officially placed Dallas well within Spanish territory by making the Red River the northern boundary of New Spain.

One European who probably visited the Dallas area was Athanase de Mezieres in 1778. De Mezieres, a Frenchman in the service of the King of Spain probably crossed the West Fork of the Trinity River near present-day Fort Worth, having followed the western edge of the Eastern Cross Timbers from the Tawakoni Village on the Brazos River near present Waco. He then proceeded north to the Red River. He wrote:

De Mezieres' biographer, Bolton, was convinced de Mezieres was describing the Eastern Cross Timbers and the route would have him crossing the West Fork of the Trinity River between the present Fort Worth and Arlington.

Present-day Dallas remained under Spanish rule until 1821, when Mexico declared independence from Spain, and the area became part of the Mexican state of Coahuila y Tejas. The Republic of Texas broke off from Mexico in 1836 and remained an independent country for nearly 10 years.

Settlement (1839–1855) 

John Neely Bryan, looking for a good trading post to serve Native Americans and settlers, first surveyed the Dallas area in 1839, perhaps drawn by the intersection of Caddo trails at one of the few natural fords for hundreds of miles along the wide Trinity floodplain. Bryan also knew that the planned Preston Trail was to run near the ford — the north–south route and the ford at Bryan's Bluff became more important when the United States annexed Texas in 1845.

After Bryan surveyed the area, he returned home to Arkansas. While there, a treaty was signed removing all Native Americans from Northern Texas. When he returned in November 1841, half of his customers were gone. He decided that, rather than a trading post, he would create a permanent settlement, which he founded in November 1841. In 1844 J. P. Dumas surveyed and laid out a  section of blocks and streets near present downtown. The origin of the name is uncertain. The official historical marker states it was named after Vice President George M. Dallas of Philadelphia, Pennsylvania. However, this is disputed. Other potential theories for the origin include his brother, Commodore Alexander James Dallas, as well as brothers Walter R. Dallas or James R. Dallas.

Early years (1856–1873) 

On 2 February 1856, Dallas was granted a town charter during the Regular session of the Sixth Texas Legislature. Samuel Pryor was elected the first mayor along with a constable, a treasurer-recorder, and six aldermen. By 1860, the town's population reached 678, including 97 African Americans (mostly enslaved), as well as Belgian, French, German, and Swiss immigrants. By that year, the railroad was approaching from the south, and several stage lines were already passing through the city.

In July 1860, a fire broke out in the square, destroying most of the buildings in the business district of Dallas. Out of fear, many white residents assumed that slaves were behind it, and two abolitionists were run out of town. They lynched three African-American slaves, and officials ordered all other slaves in Dallas to be whipped, as part of event that is known as the "Texas Troubles".  On the eve of the Civil War in 1861, Dallas County voted 741–237 in favor of secession. On 8 June of that year, a state of war was declared, and citizens were very supportive of the effort. The town was a long way from any battles, and suffered no damage from the war.

The Reconstruction period brought many challenges for Dallas and some benefits for the state. On 19 June 1865 (Juneteenth), Texan slaves were emancipated, as announcement of the end of the war was delayed. Many African Americans migrated to Dallas after the war for work, because the city was thriving compared to other Southern cities. They also wanted to leave rural areas to escape the supervision of whites and establish their own communities. Freedmen's towns were scattered throughout Dallas. In attempts to maintain white supremacy, white insurgent veterans established a Ku Klux Klan chapter in 1868.  By 1871, Dallas legally became a city. In 1869 the Reconstruction legislature established a funding mechanism to support public education for the first time, and authorized school districts to be set up across the state.

Notable Civil War veterans include William W. Ross. The Dallas Morning News states that, “William W. and Andrew J. Ross were early land owners who came to Dallas in 1866. One was a Civil War veteran, but, both men were farmers and real estate developers.”  Ross Avenue is named in honor of the two brothers and bisects the land they formerly owned.

The major north–south (Houston and Texas Central Railroad) and east–west (Texas and Pacific Railway) Texas railroad routes intersected in Dallas in 1873, thus ensuring its future as a commercial center. The arrival of the trains also meant soaring populations — the population of Dallas shot from 3,000 in early 1872 to more than 7,000 in September of the same year. New buildings and new businesses appeared daily. Dallas was the epicenter of the markets for raw materials and commodity crops, such as grains and cotton, which were shipped to the South and East. It was also the "last chance" stop for supplies for people traveling west

Industrial period (1874–1929) 

The Industrial Period saw Dallas grow from a center of farming and ranching into a major, self-sustaining industrial city. The industrial growth in Dallas formed partially out of problems hurting Dallas area farmers: After buying supplies on credit during the year, farmers owed merchants the majority of their crop. Costs to ship to the coast were very high, and the price of cotton was dropping.

By 1880, the Missouri-Kansas-Texas Railroad, under the leadership of Jay Gould, reached Dallas. In 1885, the Main Street was lit with electricity. In 1888, the Dallas Zoo opened making it the first zoological garden in the state.

In 1890, Dallas annexed the city of East Dallas, which was larger geographically than Dallas. The annexation made Dallas the most populous city in Texas. In 1893, following the national financial panic, numerous industries and five Dallas banks failed. Cotton prices dipped below five cents a pound, and the lumber and flour markets had all but vanished, so many people began leaving the city. By 1898, the city began to recover and grow again. In 1894, Parkland Memorial Hospital opened just west of Oak Lawn. In 1903, Oak Cliff, a city across the Trinity River, was annexed.

By the turn of the 20th century, Dallas was the leading drug, book, jewelry, and wholesale liquor market in the Southwestern United States. It also quickly became the center of trade in cotton, grain, and even buffalo. It was the world's leading inland cotton market, and it still led the world in manufacture of saddlery and cotton gin machinery. During the early 20th century, Dallas transformed from an agricultural center to a center of banking, insurance, fashion retailing and other businesses. Founded here were Neiman Marcus and the now-defunct A. Harris and Sanger Brothers ready-to-wear stores. The 14-story Praetorian Building was the first skyscraper west of the Mississippi River and the tallest building in Texas.

Texan blacks, Mexican Americans and poor whites were excluded from much of the progress by being disfranchised when the state legislature imposed a poll tax in 1902. In addition, it had earlier established Jim Crow laws, making racial segregation legal and imposing white supremacy.

Five people died, 4,000 were left homeless, and property damages were estimated at US$2.5 million at the time of the flood. After the flood, the city wanted to take action to control the Trinity and to build a bridge linking Oak Cliff and Dallas. In 1911, George Kessler, a city planner, created a plan for both the Trinity and the city. His plans were initially ignored but ultimately brought back, updated, in the 1920s. By the 1930s, many of his plans had been realized.

The expansion of industrial jobs attracted migrants from across the region, as well as waves of immigrants, first from southern and eastern Europe. The area bordered by Maple Avenue, McKinney Avenue and the MKT (Missouri, Kansas, Texas) Railroad became known as Little Mexico following 1910, when it was settled by a wave of Mexican immigrants, who left the disruption following the defeat of President Porfirio Diaz and his government, and the start of the Mexican Revolution (1910–1920). Mexicans from all walks of life came to the Dallas area to take jobs in factories, agriculture and the railroads.

A white mob of hundreds of people lynched a Black man, Allen Brooks, in 1910. The mob tortured Brooks, then killed him at the downtown intersection of Main and Akard by hanging him from a decorative archway inscribed with the words "Welcome Visitors." Thousands of men, women, and children came to gawk at the torture scene, collecting keepsakes of the murder. It was commemorated with picture postcards. No one was charged with a crime because authorities claimed they could not find anyone responsible.

In 1911, Dallas was chosen as the location of the eleventh regional branch of the Federal Reserve Bank. That year millionaire Dr. William Worthington Samuell, purchased the first ambulance for the city of Dallas, and later donated thousands of dollars to expand Parkland Hospital.

The growth of aviation generated new development in the city in World War I. Love Field was established as an aviation training ground. Fair Park was the home of Camp Dick, a training facility as well. The city purchased Love Field in 1927 to use as a municipal airport. In 1915, Southern Methodist University opened.

Oil period (1930–1945) 

Despite the onset of the Great Depression, business in construction was flourishing in 1930. Dallas quickly became the financial center for the oil industry in Texas and Oklahoma. Banks made loans to develop the oil fields, and Dallas became the financial center for all oil fields in the Texas Panhandle, the Permian Basin, East Texas, Gulf Coast, and Oklahoma. This put off most thoughts of depression until the middle of 1931, when falling prices and overproduction affected the city economy negatively. By then, more than 18,000 people in the city were unemployed. Before the New Deal policy began, the city had a work-for-food program that helped many.

After a long campaign in the years leading up to 1936, the state of Texas chose Dallas as the site of the 1936 Texas Centennial Exposition. More than fifty buildings were built for the Exposition in Fair Park, and 10 million visitors came to see the US$25 million spectacle (US$ in today's terms).

During World War II, Dallas served as a manufacturing center for the war effort. In 1942, the Ford Motor plant in Dallas converted to war-time production, producing only jeeps and military trucks. In 1943 the city began war rationing, with 376,085 ration books distributed.

Mid century (1946–1974) 

In 1958 a version of the integrated circuit was invented in Dallas by Jack Kilby of Texas Instruments; this event punctuated the Dallas area's development as a center for high-technology manufacturing (though the technology Mr. Kilby developed was soon usurped by a competing technology simultaneously developed in the "Silicon Valley" in California by engineers who would go on to form Intel Corporation). During the 1950s and 1960s, Dallas became the nation's third-largest technology center, with the growth of such companies as Ling-Temco-Vought (LTV Corporation) and Texas Instruments. In 1957, developers Trammell Crow and John M. Stemmons opened a Home Furnishings Mart, designed by Donald H. Speck, that grew into the Dallas Market Center, the largest wholesale trade complex in the world. The same year, the Dallas Memorial Auditorium (now the Kay Bailey Hutchison Convention Center) opened near Canton and Akard Streets in what is now the Convention Center District of downtown. On November 22, 1963, United States President John F. Kennedy was assassinated on Elm Street while his motorcade passed through Dealey Plaza in downtown Dallas. The upper two floors of the building from which Lee Harvey Oswald shot Kennedy, the Texas School Book Depository, have been converted into a historical museum covering the former president's life and accomplishments, Kennedy was declared legally dead at Parkland Memorial Hospital, 30 minutes after the shooting.

Real estate boom (1975–1985) 

In the late 1970s and early to mid-1980s, Dallas underwent the building boom which produced a distinctive contemporary profile for the downtown area and a prominent skyline, influenced by nationally acclaimed architects. By the 1980s, when the oil industry mostly relocated to Houston, Dallas was beginning to benefit from a burgeoning technology boom (driven by the growing computer and telecom industries), while continuing to be a center of banking and business. In 1983, voters in Dallas and area cities approved the creation of Dallas Area Rapid Transit to replace the Dallas Transit System. Dallas annexed Audelia in 1981, and Renner in 1983. In 1984, the Dallas Museum of Art moved from Fair Park as one of the first buildings in downtown's Arts District. Also in 1984, the Republican National Convention was held in Dallas. In 1985, at the peak of the real estate boom, the 72-story Bank of America Plaza (then InterFirst Plaza) opened as the tallest building in Dallas. From the mid-to-late 1980s, many banks, especially in Dallas, collapsed during the Savings and Loan crisis, nearly destroying the city's economy and scrapping plans for hundreds of structures.

Recession (1986–1995) 
From the mid-1980s to 2005, not a single highrise structure was built within the downtown freeway loop.  Over-speculating, over-building and the Savings and Loan crisis practically destroyed the city economically.  In 1987, Annette Strauss was inaugurated as the first female mayor of Dallas. In 1989, the Morton H. Meyerson Symphony Center opened in the Arts District of downtown. Also during this time (1991), Dallas celebrated its 150th anniversary. During this time Dallas was one of the last remaining major cities with two major newspapers covering the news. However the Dallas Times Herald ended its publication in 1991, leaving the Dallas Morning News as the lone major newspaper covering Dallas news.

Current period (1996–present) 

In the late 1990s, the booming telecom industry exploded in Dallas, especially in areas like Las Colinas and the Telecom Corridor. During this time, Dallas became known as Texas's Silicon Valley, or the "Silicon Prairie". Another recession prompted by the dot-com bubble-burst and the 2001 terrorist attacks hurt several of the city's vital industries. By 2004, signs of an economic turnaround began to appear. In 2005, three towers began construction amid tens of residential conversions and smaller residential projects. By the year 2010, the North Central Texas Council of Governments expects 10,000 residents to live within the loop. Just north, Uptown is one of the hottest real estate markets in the country. At the beginning of 2006, nine highrise residential buildings or hotels were under construction in that area. Leading the way is the $500M phase two of Victory Park, a $3B+ project. At full build-out, it should contain more than 4,000 residences and 4M ft² of office and retail space.

The Arts District in downtown became a major point of growth as the Dallas Center for the Performing Arts Foundation implemented construction on several new projects in its master plan for the area. When the Winspear Opera House (Foster and Partners) and Wyly Theatre (Office for Metropolitan Architecture - Rem Koolhaas) joined the Nasher Sculpture Center (Renzo Piano) and Meyerson Symphony Center (I.M. Pei and Partners), Dallas became the only city in the world with four buildings within one contiguous block that were all designed by Pritzker Architecture Prize winners.

On May 31, 2016, several cities experienced record setting flooding.

On July 7, 2016, multiple shots were fired at a protest in downtown Dallas, held against the police killings of two black men from other states. The gunman targeted white officers, killing five and injuring nine. This marked the deadliest day for U.S. law enforcement since the September 11 attacks.  After hours of negotiation failed, police resorted to a robot-delivered bomb, killing the gunman inside El Centro College.

On June 17, 2019, a shooting occurred outside the Earle Cabell Federal Building and Courthouse leaving the perpetrator dead and one injured.

See also 

 Dallas Historical Society
 National Register of Historic Places listings in Dallas County, Texas
 List of Dallas Landmarks

References

Bibliography

Guides and popular history
 Acheson, Sam Hanna. Dallas Yesterday, (1977).
 Buckner, Sharry. City Smart: Dallas/Ft. Worth, (2000). excerpt and text search
 Calvin, Peter A. Dallas, Texas: A Photographic Portrait, (2007). excerpt and text search
 Fitzgerald, Ken. Dallas Then and Now, (2001). excerpt and text search
 Hazel, Michael V.  Dallas: A History of Big D, (1997).
 Hill, Patricia Evridge.  Dallas: The Making of a Modern City, (1996). 
 McDonald, William L. Dallas Rediscovered: A Photographic Chronicle of Urban Expansion, 1870-1925, (1978).
 Payne, Darwin. Dallas: An Illustrated History, (1982).
 Rafferty, Robert R. Lone Star Guide to the Dallas/Fort Worth Metroplex, (2nd ed. 2003).
 Rogers, John William. The Lusty Texans of Dallas, (3rd ed. 1965).
 Shay, Kevin James. A Parent's Guide to Dallas-Fort Worth, (2003). excerpt and text search
 WPA Writers' Program. The WPA Dallas Guide and History, ed. Maxine Holmes and Gerald D. Saxon, (1939;  1992).

Specialized studies
 Acheson, Sam. 35,000 Days in Texas (1938), a history of the Dallas Morning News and its conservative political and economic positions.
 Behnken, Brian D. "The 'Dallas Way': Protest, Response, and the Civil Rights Experience in Big D and Beyond." Southwestern Historical Quarterly 2007 111(1): 1-29. 
 Biderman, Rose G. "The Sanger Brothers and Their Role in Texas History." Western States Jewish History 1996 28(2): 149–158. 
 Chipman, Donald, Randolph Campbell, and Robert Calvert. The Dallas Cowboys and the National Football League (1970).
 Clark, Emily and Patricia Gower, "'Well, Bless Your Heart!’: Rhetoric and Power in Dallas Women during the Progressive Era," East Texas Historical Journal 53#1 (Fall 2015), 48–66.
 Cristol, Gerry.  A Light in the Prairie: Temple Emanu-El of Dallas, 1872-1997. (1998). 312 pp.
 Crowell, Gwinetta Malone. To Keep Those Red Lights Burning: Dallas' Response to Prostitution, 1874-1920. Master's thesis. University of Texas at Arlington (2010). online access
 Decker, Stefanie. "Women in the Civil Rights Movement: Juanita Craft Versus the Dallas Elite." East Texas Historical Journal 2001 39(1): 33–42. 
 Enstam, Elizabeth York. "The Dallas Equal Suffrage Association, Political Style, and Popular Culture: Grassroots Strategies of the Woman Suffrage Movement, 1913-1919." Journal of Southern History 2002 68(4): 817–848.  online edition
 Enstam, Elizabeth York.  Women and the Creation of Urban Life: Dallas, Texas, 1843-1920. (1998). 284 pp.  online edition
 Fairbanks, Robert B. "Rethinking Urban Problems: Planning, Zoning, and City Government in Dallas, 1900-1930."  Journal of Urban History 1999 25(6): 809–837.  Fulltext: Ebsco
 Fairbanks, Robert B.  For the City as a Whole: Planning, Politics, and the Public Interest in Dallas, Texas, 1900-1965. (1998). 318 pp.
 Gower, Patricia E. "The Price of Exclusion: Dallas Municipal Policy and its Impact on African Americans." East Texas Historical Journal, 2001 39(1): 43–54. 
 Gower, Patricia Ellen.  "Dallas: Experiments in Progressivism, 1898-1919."  PhD dissertation Texas A. & M. U. 1996. 228 pp.  DAI 1997 58(1): 263-A. DA9718350 Fulltext: ProQuest Dissertations & Theses
 Graff, Harvey J. The Dallas Myth: The Making and Unmaking of an American City (2008). excerpt and text search
 Hazel, Michael V., ed. Dallas Reconsidered: Essays in Local History (2000), 325 pp.
 Hazel, Michael V.  The Dallas Public Library: Celebrating a Century of Service, 1901-2001. (2001), 252 pp.
 Hill, Patricia Evridge.  Dallas: The Making of a Modern City. (1996). 240 pp.  the standard scholarly history
 Hill-Aiello, Thomas A.  "Dallas, Cotton and the Transatlantic Economy, 1885-1956."  PhD dissertation U. of Texas, Arlington 2006. 326 pp.  DAI 2007 67(9): 3555-A. DA3229563 Fulltext: ProQuest Dissertations & Theses
  Linden, Glenn M.  Desegregating Schools in Dallas. (1995). 243 pp.
 Lowe, Theodore M. “Racial Politics in Dallas in the Twentieth Century,” East Texas Historical Journal, 46#2 (2008), 27–41.
 McElhaney, Jacquelyn Masur.  Pauline Periwinkle and Progressive Reform in Dallas. (1998). 201 pp.  online edition
 Morgan, Ruth P.  Governance by Decree: The Impact of the Voting Rights Act in Dallas. University Press of Kansas, 2004. 326 pp.
  Ofman, May Walters.  "The Practice of Social Welfare: A Case Study in Dallas, Texas, 1890-1929."  PhD dissertation U. of Michigan 1999. 456 pp.  DAI 2000 60(7): 2650-A. DA9938505 Fulltext: ProQuest Dissertations & Theses
  Payne, Darwin.  As Old as Dallas Itself: A History of Lawyers in Dallas, the Dallas Bar Associations, and the City They Helped Build. (1999). 325 pp.
 Phillips, Michael.  White Metropolis: Race, Ethnicity, and Religion in Dallas, 1841-2001. (2006). 300 pp.
 Phillips, Michael. "White Violence, Hegemony, and Slave Rebellion in Dallas, Texas, Before the Civil War." East Texas Historical Journal 1999 37(2): 25–35. 
 Prior,  Marsha, and Robert V. Kemper. "From Freedman's Town to Uptown: Community Transformation and Gentrification in Dallas, Texas," Urban Anthropology and Studies of Cultural Systems and World Economic Development, Vol. 34, 2005  online edition
 Tatman, Arthur T. La Camara, 1939: a 'Mexican; Chamber of Commerce Forms in Dallas. Journal of the West (2006) 45(4): 36-47.  online at ABC-CLIO
 Thometz, Carol Estes. The Decision-Makers: The Power Structure of Dallas, (1963).online edition
 Williams, Roy H. and Kevin James Shay. And Justice for All: The Untold History of Dallas. (1999). excerpt and text search

Online resources
 Handbook of Texas Online (2008), with many articles about Dallas-related people and topics
 
Lost Dallas - by D Magazine

External links
 
 Dallas History from the Dallas Historical Society
 Dallas Police Department, published 1910, hosted by the Portal to Texas History
 Dallas, Texas, published 1910, hosted by the Portal to Texas History

 
Dallas